Martha Sánchez Néstor (4 February 1974 – 30 July 2021) was a Mexican Indigenous human and women's rights activist.
She died from complications of COVID-19.

Awards and honors
In 2012, she received the Omecíhuatl medal "For outstanding contributions to the recognition and exercise of women's human rights".

References

1974 births
2021 deaths
Amuzgos
Mexican human rights activists
Mexican feminists
Indigenous Mexican women
People from Guerrero
Deaths from the COVID-19 pandemic in Mexico